HMS Neptune was a  light cruiser which served with the Royal Navy during World War II.

Neptune was the fourth ship of its class and was the ninth Royal Navy vessel to carry the name. Built by Portsmouth Dockyard, the vessel was laid down on 24 September 1931, launched on 31 January 1933, and commissioned into the Royal Navy on 12 February 1934 with the pennant number "20".

Operational history
During World War II, Neptune operated with a crew drawn predominantly from the New Zealand Division of the Royal Navy. The ship also carried a large contingent of seconded South African personnel.

In December 1939, several months after war was declared, Neptune was patrolling in the South Atlantic in pursuit of German surface raider pocket battleship (heavy cruiser) . Neptune, with other patrolling Royal Navy heavy units, was sent to Uruguay in the aftermath of the Battle of the River Plate. However, she was still in transit when the Germans scuttled Graf Spee off Montevideo on 17 December.

Neptune was the first British ship to spot the Italian Fleet in the battle of Calabria, on 9 July 1940, marking also the first time since the Napoleonic Wars that the Mediterranean Fleet received the signal "enemy battle fleet in sight". During the subsequent engagement, she was hit by the Italian light cruiser . The 6-inch shell splinters damaged her floatplane beyond repair, its wreckage being thrown into the sea. Minutes later her main guns struck the heavy cruiser Bolzano three times, inflicting some damage on her torpedo room, below the waterline and the "B" turret.
During 1941, she led Force K, a raiding squadron of cruisers. Their task was to intercept and destroy German and Italian convoys en route to Libya. The convoys were supplying Rommel's Afrika Korps in North Africa with troops and equipment.

Sinking
Force K was sent out on 18 December 1941, to intercept a convoy bound for Tripoli, right after the brief fleet engagement at sunset known as First Battle of Sirte.

On the night of 19–20 December, Neptune, leading the line, struck two mines, part of an Italian minefield laid by an Italian cruiser force in June 1941. The first struck the anti-mine screen, causing no damage. The second struck the bow hull.

While reversing out of the minefield, Neptune struck a third mine, which took off her propellers and left her dead in the water. Penelope was also unable to assist.

The former struck a mine and began drifting. Neptune then signalled for Lively to keep clear. (Kandahar was later evacuated and scuttled with a torpedo by the destroyer , to prevent her capture.)

Neptune hit a fourth mine and quickly capsized, killing 737 crew members. The other 30 initially survived the sinking but they too died. As a result, only one was still alive when their carley float was picked up five days later by the Italian torpedo boat . The sole survivor, Norman Walton, spent 15 months in an Italian prisoner of war camp. In 1991, Walton travelled to the small city of Nelson, New Zealand, to unveil a memorial to Neptune. Of the 736 that perished, 150 were New Zealand sailors, including four from Nelson. A memorial service to Neptune and her crew is held each year in Nelson.

See also 
 First Battle of Sirte

References

Notes

Sources

External links

 HMS Neptune Association

 

Leander-class cruisers (1931) of the Royal Navy
Ships built in Portsmouth
1933 ships
World War II cruisers of the United Kingdom
World War II shipwrecks in the Mediterranean Sea
Military history of New Zealand
Maritime incidents in December 1941
Ships sunk by mines